William Morehay (fl. 1402–1407) of Exeter, Devon, was an English politician.

He was a Member (MP) of the Parliament of England for Exeter in 1402 and 1407.

References

14th-century births
15th-century deaths
English MPs 1402
Members of the Parliament of England (pre-1707) for Exeter
English MPs 1407